Waverly High School (WHS) is a public high school in Waverly, Ohio, United States. It is the only high school in the Waverly City School District.

Music and Arts 
Polarity, WHS pop a cappella group, received third place in the national a cappella competition, Harmony Sweepstakes, in May 2019.

Athletics
The school's athletic affiliation is with the Ohio High School Athletic Association (OHSAA) and the Southern Ohio Conference (SOC), which has seventeen member schools and is divided into two divisions (SOC I and SOC II) based on the schools' enrollment. The SOC includes teams from four different Ohio counties - Jackson County (Oak Hill High School), Lawrence County (Saint Joseph Central High School and Symmes Valley High School), Pike County (Waverly High School, Eastern High School, and Western High School), and Scioto County (Clay High School, Green High School, Glenwood High School, Sciotoville Community School, Valley High School, Northwest High School, Minford High School, Portsmouth West High School, Notre Dame High School, South Webster High School, and Wheelersburg High School). 
See also Ohio High School Athletic Conferences and the Southern Ohio Conference

Ohio High School Athletic Association championships and appearances
Boys' Baseball – 1954 (Waverly def. Sycamore 2–1)
Boys' Basketball - OHSAA Final Four Appearance - 1970 (Dayton Chaminade d. Waverly 73–55)
1973 - Associated Press Class AA Boys' Basketball Poll Champion (17-1)
 '''2021-2022 - OHSAA Final Four Appearance
(Gilmour Academy d. Waverly 58-43)

References

External links
 

High schools in Pike County, Ohio
Public high schools in Ohio